Mohamoud Haibe District is a district in Hargeisa, Somaliland. It is one of the eight administrative districts of Hargeisa City.

See also

References

Districts of Hargeisa